Acrolophus bicornutus is a moth of the family Acrolophidae. It is found in Florida.

The wingspan is about 13 mm.

References

Moths described in 1964
bicornutus